The 2019 Asian Karate Championships were the 16th edition of the Asian Karate Championships, and were held in Tashkent, Uzbekistan from July 19 to July 21, 2019.

In the women's 68 kg event, the gold medalist Nodira Djumaniyazova of Uzbekistan has violated WKF Anti-doping Rules, Art Rules. As a result, Ceyco Georgia Zefanya received the gold medal and Chao Jou received the silver medal.

Medalists

Men

Women

Medal table

References

External links
List of medalists (Archived version)
 WKF

Asian Championships
Asian Karate Championships
Asian Karate Championships
Asian Karate Championships
Sport in Tashkent